Fullarton Road is a main road in the South Australian capital city of Adelaide.

Route
It runs north–south in a straight line from the eastern edge of the CBD to the south-eastern suburbs of the city. Its northern beginning is at the intersection of Payneham and Magill Roads, the site of the former Maid and Magpie Hotel. Travelling south from there the next significant intersection is at the western end of Norwood Parade, an intersection controlled by traffic lights. Continuing south brings one to the infamous Britannia Roundabout (at the western end of Kensington Road), and then through the traffic-light-controlled intersections with Greenhill Road, Glen Osmond Road (which is Highway 1), Cross Road and Maitland Street where the main traffic flow veers right and the road changes name. Fullarton Road is part of the City Ring Route (R1) between the Britannia Roundabout and Greenhill Road.

The section of Fullarton Road south of Greenhill Road (at least, perhaps from South Terrace) was once designated Brownhill Creek Road and was more directly connected to the present-day remainder of Brownhill Creek Road which runs beside Brown Hill Creek (Willawilla) in Mitcham and Brown Hill Creek locality.

The temporary Adelaide Street Circuit racetrack includes a portion of Fullarton Road. Since 1985, a partial road closure has occurred most years to open the racetrack for motorsport events.

Major intersections

References

City of Burnside
Roads in Adelaide
Highway 1 (Australia)